Yevsyunin (masculine) or Yevsyunina (feminine) is a Russian last name, a variant of Yevsyukov.

The following people share this last name:
Anastasia Evsyunina (Anastasiya Yevsyunina), Russian biathlete participating in the Biathlon European Championships 2014
Sergey Yevsyunin, Soviet actor playing an evil wizard in the 1970 children's movie The Secret of the Iron Door

See also
Yevsyunino, a rural locality (a village) in Kirillovsky District of Vologda Oblast, Russia

References

Notes

Sources
И. М. Ганжина (I. M. Ganzhina). "Словарь современных русских фамилий" (Dictionary of Modern Russian Last Names). Москва, 2001. 

Russian-language surnames
